{{Infobox football club season
| club               = Raja CA
| season             = 2022–23
| manager            = Faouzi Benzarti(until 21 September 2022)Mondher Kebaier(from 24 September 2022)
| mgrtitle           = Manager
| chairman           = Aziz El Badraoui
| chrtitle           = President
| stadium            = Stade Mohammed V
| league             = Botola
| league result=4th
| cup1               = Throne Cup
| cup1 result        = Round of 16
| cup2               = Champions League
| cup2 result=Group stage
| league topscorer= Mohamed Nahiri (6)
| season topscorer   =
| largest win = 5-0 vs Vipers SC, Champions League, 10 February 2023  
| largest loss = 3–1 vs OC Safi, Botola, 28 January 2023
| highest attendance = 
| lowest attendance  = 
| average attendance = 
 | pattern_la1            = _RajaAC2122h
 | pattern_b1             = _RajaAC2122h
 | pattern_ra1            = _RajaAC2122h
 | pattern_sh1            = _RajaAC2122h 
 | pattern_so1            = _kappafootballwhitelogo
 | leftarm1               = 008000|  body1 = | rightarm1 = 008000 |shorts1= 00B262 |socks1= 00B262
 | pattern_la2            = _KappaGreenWhite
 | pattern_b2             = _RajaAC2122a
 | pattern_ra2            = _KappaGreenWhite
 | pattern_sh2            = _kappagreen 
 | pattern_so2            = _kappafootballgreenlogo
 | leftarm2               = FFFFFF | body2 = FFFFFF | rightarm2 = FFFFF | shorts2 = FFFFFF | socks2 = FFFFFF
 | pattern_la3            = _RajaAC2122t
 | pattern_b3             = _RajaAC2122t
 | pattern_ra3            = _RajaAC2122t
 | pattern_sh3            = _RajaAC2122t
 | pattern_so3            = _kappafootballblacklogo
| prevseason         = 2021–22
| nextseason         = 2023–24
}}
The 2022–23 season is Raja Club Athletic's 74th season in existence and the club's 66th consecutive season in the top flight of Moroccan football. In addition to the domestic league, they are also participating in, they are also participating in this season's editions of the Throne Cup and Champions League.

The season is the first since 2010–11 without Abdelilah Hafidi, who departed to Al-Hazem FC, and the first since 2013–14 without Abdeljalil Jbira.

 Players 

 First-team squad 
Players and squad numbers last updated on 30 January 2023.Note: Flags indicate national team as has been defined under FIFA eligibility rules. Players may hold more than one non-FIFA nationality.

 New contracts 

 Transfers 

In

Out

Competitions
Overview

{| class="wikitable" style="text-align: center"
|-
!rowspan=2|Competition
!colspan=8|Record
!rowspan=2|Started round
!rowspan=2|Final position / round
!rowspan=2|First match	
!rowspan=2|Last match
|-
!
!
!
!
!
!
!
!
|-
| Botola

|  
| To be confirmed| 4 September 2022
| In Progress|-
| Throne Cup

| Round of 32 
| To be confirmed| 15 March 2023
| In Progress|-
| Champions League

| Second round
| To be confirmed| 8 October 2022
| In Progress''
|-
! Total

Botola

League table

Results summary

Results by round

Matches

Throne Cup

CAF Champions League

Qualifying rounds

Second round

Group stage

Group C

Squad information

Goalscorers
Includes all competitive matches. The list is sorted alphabetically by surname when total goals are equal.

Clean sheets

Notes

References

Raja CA seasons
Raja CA
Raja CA